Costas Mandylor (born Costas Theodosopoulos; 3 September 1965) is an Australian actor. He is best known for his role as Kenny in Picket Fences and for portraying Mark Hoffman in the Saw films.

Early life 
Costas Theodosopoulos was born on 3 September 1965 in Melbourne, Australia to Greek immigrants Louis Theodosopoulos, a taxi driver and Yannis Theodosopoulos. His brother is actor Louis Mandylor. Mandylor grew up in St Kilda and South Melbourne, and moved to the United States in 1987 where he started taking acting lessons. He was initially unable to find any work acting and had to work any job available.  He took a version of his mother's maiden name, citing his real name in Greek being too long.

Career 
Mandylor's first major role was in the 1989 film Triumph of the Spirit playing a European Jew, which was filmed at the Auschwitz-Birkenau death camp. He returned to Los Angeles meeting director Oliver Stone and auditioned and got the role of an Italian count in The Doors (1991). Mandylor landed a leading role in Mobsters playing Mafia boss Frank Costello. He went mentally prepared for the role, telling the Los Angeles Times, "It was interesting that I got that part, because I felt tuned in to gangsters, it was a genre I'd read a lot. When I was 13, I got a job as a dishwasher in a Melbourne nightclub and saw everything there, real gangsters, and had met characters who were dangerous people from an underground world." In 1992, he had a lead role on the CBS television drama, Picket Fences, playing officer Kenny Lacos until the show ended in 1996. Mandylor also had a lead role in the Saw films as Detective Mark Hoffman, in Saw III (2006), Saw IV (2007), Saw V (2008), Saw VI (2009) and Saw 3D (2010).

Personal life 
Mandylor played professional football/soccer in Europe until suffering shin splints. In 1991, he was chosen by People as one of the "50 Most Beautiful People in the world".

Mandylor married Talisa Soto in May 1997; they divorced in 2000.

Credits

Film

Television

References

External links 

 
 

1965 births
Male actors from Melbourne
Australian male television actors
Australian people of Greek descent
Greek emigrants to the United States
Australian expatriate male actors in the United States
Australian male film actors
Living people